William Ernest, Grand Duke of Saxe-Weimar-Eisenach (Wilhelm Ernst Karl Alexander Friedrich Heinrich Bernhard Albert Georg Hermann, ; 10 June 1876 – 24 April 1923), was the last Grand Duke of Saxe-Weimar-Eisenach.

Biography
He was born in Weimar, the eldest son of Karl August of Saxe-Weimar-Eisenach, heir to the Grand Duke, and his wife Princess Pauline of Saxe-Weimar-Eisenach.

He succeeded his grandfather Karl Alexander as Grand Duke on 5 January 1901, as his father had predeceased him.

His heir was a distant cousin, Prince Hermann of Saxe-Weimar-Eisenach, until his disinheritance in 1909. Hermann's younger brother subsequently served as heir presumptive to the Grand Duchy of Saxe-Weimar-Eisenach until the birth of William Ernest's eldest son.

Wilhelm Ernst created the new Weimar town centre under the direction of Hans Olde, Henry van de Velde, and Adolf Brütt. He also had the University of Jena rebuilt by Theodor Fischer and also reconstructed Weimar's theatres. The improvements to the city included a marble statue of his predecessor Charles Alexander, which was completed in 1911. It was placed in a setting designed by Brütt. The placement of the setting was designed to distinguish the "old town" from the newly built area. A preservation law for the "old town" barred it to the "art nouveau"-style which was used in the new area.

The Dutch throne
According to the Dutch constitution, Wilhelm Ernst was in the line for the throne of the Netherlands (as the grandson of Princess Sophie of the Netherlands) after Queen Wilhelmina. At the beginning of the 20th century, the Dutch feared the possibility of German influence or even annexation of the Netherlands. In order to prevent this, some lawyers tried to change the constitution to exclude Wilhelm Ernst from the succession. Another proposal, however, was this: if Wilhelmina would die childless, then he or his offspring would have to choose between the Dutch and the Weimar throne. The birth of Wilhelmina's daughter Juliana in 1909 lessened the chance for any member of the House of Wettin (Saxe-Weimar-Eisenach branch) to inherit the Dutch throne. With the amendment to the constitution of 1922, which restricted the right of succession to the offspring of Wilhelmina, the possibility disappeared entirely.

Abdication
On 9 November 1918, Grand Duke Wilhelm Ernst - along with the rest of the German monarchs following the defeat of Germany in World War I - was forced to abdicate. His throne and all his lands were relinquished and he fled with his family to the family estate in Silesia, where he died five years later.

Despite all his work for Weimar during his government, Wilhelm Ernst was a hated ruler. This was for his private life, where he was known to be a sadist; the day of his abdication, he was called the "most unpopular prince in all Germany".

He died in Heinrichau in Silesia.

Family and children
In Bückeburg on 30 April 1903 Wilhelm Ernst married first to Princess Caroline Reuss of Greiz, a daughter of Prince Heinrich XXII Reuss of Greiz. This marriage was childless and ended in 1905 with the death of Caroline under mysterious circumstances.  The official cause of death was pneumonia following influenza; other sources have suggested suicide.

In Meiningen on 21 January 1910, Wilhelm Ernst married second to Princess Feodora of Saxe-Meiningen, daughter of Prince Friedrich Johann of Saxe-Meinigen.

They had four children:

Honours
He received the following orders and decorations:

Ancestry

References

|-

|-

1876 births
1923 deaths
Hereditary Grand Dukes of Saxe-Weimar-Eisenach
Nobility from Weimar
Heirs presumptive to the Dutch throne
Princes of Saxe-Weimar-Eisenach
Protestant monarchs
Grand Dukes of Saxe-Weimar-Eisenach
Generals of Infantry (Prussia)
Grand Crosses of the Order of Saint Stephen of Hungary
Recipients of the Order of the Netherlands Lion
Knights Grand Cross of the Order of Orange-Nassau